Three ships of the Royal Navy have borne the name HMS Anthony:

 , built in 1417
 , in service between 1588 and 1599
 , an A-class destroyer launched in 1929 and scrapped in 1948

See also
 

Royal Navy ship names